Rho Ceti , Latinized from ρ Ceti, is the Bayer designation for a star in the equatorial constellation of Cetus. It is faintly visible to the naked eye with an apparent visual magnitude of 4.885. The distance to this star, based upon an annual parallax shift of 7.15 mas, is around 460 light years.

This is an A-type main sequence star with a stellar classification of A0 V. It is spinning rapidly with a projected rotational velocity of 219 km/s, giving the star an oblate shape with an equatorial bulge that is 10% larger than the polar radius. The star has an estimated size 3.1 times the radius of the Sun and is radiating 178 times the solar luminosity from its outer atmosphere at an effective temperature of 8,905 K.

Name
This star, along with π Cet, ε Cet and σ Cet, was Al Sufi's Al Sadr al Ḳaiṭos, the Whale's Breast 

References

External links 
http://www.alcyone.de/SIT/bsc/HR0708.html
http://server3.wikisky.org/starview?object_type=1&object_id=1611

Cetus, Rho
Cetus (constellation)
Cetus, Rho
Ceti, 72
BD-12 451
015130
011345
0708